A silent call is a telephone call in which the calling party does not speak when the call is answered. Most such calls are generated by a cold call telemarketing operation's predictive dialer which makes many calls, and sometimes does not have an agent immediately available to handle an answered call; the called party hears silence ("dead air"), followed by the call being disconnected.  This differs from a ghost call, which is not dialed intentionally, and is due to technical issues or pocket dialing.

In the U.S., the Federal Trade Commission (FTC) uses the term "abandoned call" instead of silent call in its regulations applying to telemarketing. "Abandoned call" in non-FTC contexts may refer to a caller who hangs up when the call is not answered promptly.

For more information on why the technology makes silent calls, see predictive dialer.

Other reasons for silent calls
People using telecommunications devices for the deaf (TDDs) and calling public agencies might expect the agency being called to answer with a teletypewriter (TTY).  The caller waits for "TTY tones" to be generated over the phone line.  The answerer should place the phone receiver into the TTY coupler and type anything ("Hello, Go Ahead") so the caller knows it is connected.  It is inappropriate for public agencies that have a TTY to hang up on a silent call.

Many silent calls are a result of a process known as pinging. This is very similar to an Internet Protocol (IP) ping, where the intention is to see if there is life at the destination. This is often used by data cleaning companies as a method of removing dead telephone numbers from old lists. Each number is dialed and immediately dropped if the call appears to be going through; if it is not dropped quickly enough, it may make the telephone ring briefly.

Telemarketing and the UK DMA
It is believed that most, although not all, silent calls are made by telemarketing agencies.

Around 10% of dialler users in the UK are members of the Direct Marketing Association (DMA) which is an industry interest group for telemarketing in the UK. The DMA code of conduct rules that no more than 5% of the calls made per day should be silent. Many consumer groups consider this too high, and initially campaigned for this to be lowered to 3%.

The legal position in the UK
There is no law that declares silent calls illegal, although the Communications Act 2003 states:

"127.2 A person is guilty of an offense if, for the purpose of causing annoyance, inconvenience or needless anxiety to another, he-
.../cut/...
(c) persistently makes use of a public electronic communications network."

In 2003, OFCOM investigated two separate companies who were believed to be making silent calls. They were investigated under this section of the legislation because it was believed that they were "causing annoyance, inconvenience or needless anxiety". Unofficial warnings were issued, but OFCOM did not use powers given to it under the act until 3 May 2005, when it issued a "notification" (an official written warning) to one of the companies. The terms of the notification imposed a maximum proportion of 5% silent calls.

On 1 March 2006, OFCOM published their revised policy requiring that
 Abandoned calls must carry a recorded message about the company calling.
 Calling line identification must be presented on all outbound calls from call centres using automated calling systems.
 Telephone calls abandoned should not be re-dialed for at least 72 hours, unless a dedicated person is available.
 Abandoned call rates must be less than 3% in any 24-hour period.
 Suitable records must be kept.

OFCOM also announced that it had completed an investigation into seven companies in relation to silent calls. Notifications were issued to four of these, imposing a new limit of 3% abandoned calls. An undertaking (without official notification) was secured from another company for the same performance. The sixth company's actions did not constitute persistent misuse. The final company has stopped accepting contracts to send unsolicited fax communications.

On 3 November 2006, Ofcom published a statement indicating that it was taking action against 4 companies.  
 Carphone Warehouse plc;
 Brakenbay Kitchens Ltd;
 Space Kitchens Ltd; and
 IDT Direct Ltd (trading as Toucan).
The full notification is at OFCOM.org.uk.

In 2008, Barclaycard was fined the maximum penalty at the time of £50,000. A government consultation was started with a view to increasing the maximum penalty, with suggestions from £250,000 to £2,000,000.

On 1 February 2011, new legislation came into force, with a maximum penalty of £2,000,000 for companies that issue silent calls more than once a day to the same customer.

Unfortunately, a large proportion of nuisance telemarketing calls to the UK originate outside the UK, so are not subject to OFCOM regulation.

The No Agent Available (NAA) message
One solution to silent calls is for marketing organizations to play a recorded message to the consumer explaining why the call was silent and why no agent was available. The industry, led by the DMA, resisted this for a long time because it was assumed that it would be termed illegal under article 19 of the Privacy and Electronic Communications (EC Directive) Regulations 2003 (PERC):

"Use of automated calling systems
19.  - (1) A person shall neither transmit, nor instigate the transmission of, communications comprising recorded matter for direct marketing purposes by means of an automated calling system except in the circumstances referred to in paragraph (2)."

(Further guidance on the PERC 2003)

However, after extensive campaigning from a consumer called David Hickson the industry reviewed its position and started to further investigate the matter.

A private consulting firm contacted the information commissioner on 13 July 2005 and got confirmation that a NAA message is acceptable, on the condition that the message itself does not contain any marketing information. On 25 July 2005, this consulting firm then released a framework to help call centres implement the NAA message, entitled Voluntary Dialing Code.

However, many believed that even if an NAA message was legal in terms of the PERC, OFCOM could still find that it was persistent misuse.

On 17 August 2005, MP John Hemming received confirmation from OFCOM that usage of the NAA message would not be termed a persistent misuse, and there was no widespread belief that OFCOM would conclude that the six companies it was investigating should stop making silent calls and use the information message instead.

OFCOM did not indicate what quantity of NAA is acceptable.
On 18 August 2005, the DMA pledged to update its code.

References

Telemarketing
Call